Hodgson's redstart (Phoenicurus hodgsoni) is a species of bird in the family Muscicapidae.

It is found in Bhutan, China, India, Myanmar, and Nepal.

Its natural habitat is temperate forests.

It is a winter visitor in the Himalayas.

Gallery

References

Hodgson's redstart
Birds of Bhutan
Birds of China
Birds of Tibet
Birds of Yunnan
Hodgson's redstart
Taxonomy articles created by Polbot